Animal Welfare Party (AWP) is a minor political party in the United Kingdom campaigning on an animal welfare, environment and health platform.

History
The party was founded in December 2006 by Jasmijn de Boo, a Dutch national, of Kennington, London, and Shaun Rutherford of Milford Haven, Wales, as Animals Count! The party was registered with the Electoral Commission on 22 January 2007.

In October 2010, Vanessa Hudson was elected as party leader. In 2013, the party changed its name from Animals Count! to the Animal Welfare Party.

In June 2013, Hudson joined leaders from other animal protection parties from across Europe in a meeting in The Hague organised by the Animal Politics Foundation of the Netherlands. At this meeting the animal protection parties of the Netherlands, Spain, Portugal, Germany, Denmark, Italy, Turkey and the UK discussed ways in which they could work together more effectively. Later that month, Hudson announced that the Animal Welfare Party would stand in the London region in the 2014 European Parliament elections. It was one of seven European animal protection parties contesting the 2014 European elections with the aim of returning dedicated representatives for animals to the EU Parliament. This European group of parties became known informally as the EuroAnimal7 and includes PvdD of The Netherlands, PACMA of Spain, PAN of Portugal, Partei Mensch Umwelt Tierschutz of Germany, Djurens Parti of Sweden and Animal Party Cyprus.

In September 2017, the party gained its first elected representative after Alsager Town Councillor Jane Smith defected from the Green Party to the AWP. Smith was re-elected in May 2019.

Electoral history
It initially intended to stand in the Welsh Assembly election in 2007. In the 2008 London Assembly election, de Boo stood in Lambeth and Southwark, receiving 1,828 votes (1.12%). The party sponsored an electoral list of three candidates for the 2009 European Parliament election in the East of England, receiving 13,201 votes (0.8%).

In the 2010 United Kingdom general election, the party contested one seat, which it did not win. The party sponsored an electoral list of eight candidates for the 2014 European Parliament election in the London region, receiving 21,092 votes (1.0%). Four AWP candidates contested the 2015 general election, all losing their deposits. They stood in the 2016 London Assembly election, receiving 1% of the vote. They stood four candidates in the 2017 general election and six in the 2019 general election: none were elected. They stood again in the 2021 London Assembly election, receiving nearer to 2% of the vote.

Elections contested

Parliamentary elections

General election, 6 May 2010
Note: Standing as "Animals Count"

General election, 7 May 2015

Scottish Parliament election, 5 May 2016

General election, 8 June 2017

General election, 12 December 2019

Scottish Parliament election, 6 May 2021

European Parliament elections

2009 European elections
Note: Standing as "Animals Count"

2014 European elections

2019 European elections

See also
 Animal welfare in the United Kingdom
 Conservative Animal Welfare Foundation
 List of animal advocacy parties

References

External links

 

2006 establishments in the United Kingdom
Animal advocacy parties
Animal welfare organisations based in the United Kingdom
Political parties established in 2007
Political parties in the United Kingdom